Cthulhu Rise is Ukrainian musical group based in Kyiv, making music in areas of progressive rock and mathcore with elements of jazzcore and jazz fusion.

Band members

Current lineup
 Ivan "S_D" Serdyuk (guitar)
 Stanislav "Beaver" Bobritsky (keyboards)
 Alexander Chub (bass)
 Andy "Gone" Prischenko (drums)

Previous members
 Konstantin "Kurt" Yerasov (vocals, 2007-2009)R.I.P.
 Dmitriy "Big" Sazonov (vocals, 2009-2010)
 Yury Demirskiy (bass, 2007-2012)

Discography
 42 (2012)
 The Second One (2016)
 Last (2020)

Reviews
 http://avantgarde-metal.com/cthulhu-rise-42-2012/ (English)
 http://www.sonicabuse.com/2013/05/cthulhu-rise-42-album-review/ (English)
 http://kakereco.com/cd.php?id=66682 (Japanese)
 http://www.musikreviews.de/reviews/2013/Cthulhu-Rise/42/ (German)
 http://www.musikreviews.de/interviews/08-02-2013/Cthulhu-Rise/ (German)
 https://web.archive.org/web/20140113040631/http://www.iopages.nl/archief/io114.html (Dutch)
 http://www.progarchives.com/album.asp?id=52963 (English)

References

External links
 Official website
 Chtulhu Rise Bandcamp Account
 Cthulhu Rise Facebook Account

Ukrainian rock music groups
Ukrainian progressive rock groups
Mathcore musical groups
Musical groups established in 2007